The bilateral relations between the Italian Republic and the United Kingdom of Great Britain and Northern Ireland are warm and exceptionally strong. This relationship is also known as Anglo–Italian relations.

The Italian ambassador to the United Kingdom is Raffaele Trombetta since January 2018; the British ambassador to Italy is Edward Llewellyn since February 2022.

Country comparison

History

Diplomatic relations between Britain and Italy predate both Britain and Italy's unification, with diplomatic exchanges between the Papal States and England growing particularly heated during the investiture disputes between kings William and John and their respective archbishops of Canterbury Anselm and Langton. The latter feud ended with John's excommunication being lifted in exchange for swearing his fealty to the papacy.

Later, the Court of St. James hosted ambassadors from various states of the Italian peninsula, including those of the Kingdom of Sicily and Piedmont's Count Perron.
The British government gave moral and diplomatic support to the "Risorgimento" (Unification of Italy) and the creation of the modern Italian state against considerable international opposition.  The famed hero of unification, Giuseppe Garibaldi was widely celebrated in Britain, with a peak in 1861.

Twentieth century

Italy and Britain concluded the London Pact and entered a formal alliance on 26 April 1915. Following this, Britain, Italy, and the rest of the Allied Nations won the First World War. During that war, British intelligence subsidized Benito Mussolini's activism. Following the march on Rome, Italy initially maintained their close ties with Great Britain. Both countries stood opposed to the French occupation of the Ruhr, and found common ground on the formation of the Four-Power Pact. However, it became clear that Mussolini's expansionist ambitions began to run opposed to Britain's desire to uphold the status quo in the Mediterranean.

The initial Corfu incident did little to endear Italo-British relations. Italy occupied the Greek island of Corfu following a disputed killing of Italian arbitrators on the mission to more clearly define the Greco-Albanian border. The conference of Ambassadors that followed was seen as Mussolini's first diplomatic victory, where Italy was granted concessions from Greece, including paving the way for the secession of Jubaland from Britain in modern-day Somalia.

Relations finally broke down following the Italian invasion of Abyssinia. Under the guidelines of the League of Nations, Great Britain implemented economic sanctions against Italy, which would cause a lasting rift in their relationship. Although attempts were made to accommodate Italy's ambitions with the Hoare-Laval Pact, which would accept the expansion of Italian Eritrea's sphere of influence over all of Abyssinia (modern Ethiopia). However, the treaty's unpopularity forced Hoare's resignation, and future British governments showed more opposition.<ref>James  C. Robertson,  “The Origins of British Opposition to Mussolini over Ethiopia.” Journal of British Studies'''
, vol. 9, no. 1, 1969, pp. 122–142. JSTOR, www.jstor.org/stable/175172</ref> The subsequent lack of recognition of Italian East Africa from Great Britain made it apparent that Italy would need to seek approval elsewhere.

With Italy and Germany increasingly facilitating cooperation, Britain made an attempt to prevent Italy from further drifting into Germany's sphere of influence. On April 16, 1938, Italy and Britain signed the Easter Accords, which helped to obtain consensus over the status quo in the Arabian peninsula, uphold freedom of navigation in the Suez, and to preserve the peace between their colonial possessions in East Africa. Ethiopia was conveniently not named in the agreements. This ultimately proved to be insufficient in reattaining the previously friendly attitude between the two Empires.

Owing to Mussolini's Axis Pact between his Italy and Hitler's Germany, in 1940 Italy joined the Second World War on the side of Germany. Britain and Italy were thus at war through the early 1940s, until the Allied invasion of Sicily ended with Italy's defeat in 1943. The Italian government overthrew Mussolini in 1943 and signed an armistice with the Allies. Germany meanwhile invaded the northern half of Italy, released Mussolini, and set up the Italian Social Republic, a puppet regime that helped Germany fight against the Allies until it collapsed in spring 1945.

The United Kingdom and Italy now enjoy a warm and friendly relationship. Queen Elizabeth II made four state visits to the Italian Republic during her reign, in 1961, 1980, 2000, and April 2014, when she was received by President Giorgio Napolitano.

Cultural relations
Between 4 and 5 million British tourists visit Italy every year, while 1 million Italian tourists visit the UK. There are about 30,000 British nationals living in Italy, and 200,000 Italians living in the UK.

In 2011, 7,100 Italian students were studying in UK universities, this is the seventh-highest figure amongst EU countries and fifteenth globally.

Association football, in its modern form, was said to have been introduced to Italy by British expatriates during the 1880s. Genoa Cricket and Football Club, founded by Englishmen in 1893, was allegedly formed as a cricket club to represent England abroad. Three years later in 1896 a man named James Richardson Spensley arrived in Genoa introducing the football section of the club and becoming its first manager. Other evidence suggests that Edoardo Bosio, a merchant worker in the British textile industry had visited the United Kingdom and decided to introduce the sport in his homeland. He returned to Turin in 1887 and founded Torino Football and Cricket Club.

Politics
Both states are members of the NATO, Council of Europe, Organization for Security and Co-operation in Europe and the G7.

 Resident diplomatic missions 
 Italy has an embassy in London, a consulate-general in Edinburgh and a consulate in Manchester.
 United Kingdom has an embassy in Rome, a consulate-general in Milan and a consulate in Naples.

See also
 List of Ambassadors from the United Kingdom to Italy
 Foreign relations of the United Kingdom
 Foreign relations of Italy
 Italians in the United Kingdom
 Holy See–United Kingdom Relations (including its history as the Papal States)
 European Union–United Kingdom relations

References

Further reading
 Baldoli, Claudia. Exporting fascism: Italian fascists and Britain's Italians in the 1930s (Oxford: Berg, 2003).
 Edwards, Peter G. "Britain, Mussolini and the 'Locarno-Geneva System'." European History Quarterly 10.1 (1980): 1-16.
 Hayes, Paul. Modern British Foreign Policy: The Nineteenth Century 1814-80 (1975) pp. 194–212.
 Horn, David Bayne. Great Britain and Europe in the eighteenth century (1967), covers 1603 to 1702; pp 327–51.
 Morewood, Steven, "Anglo-Italian Rivalry in the Mediterranean and Middle East, 1935–1940." in  Robert Boyce, Esmonde M. Robertson, eds. Paths to War (Macmillan Education UK, 1989). pp 167–198.
 O'Connor, Maura. The romance of Italy and the English political imagination (Macmillan, 1998).
 Robertson, James C. “The Origins of British Opposition to Mussolini over Ethiopia.” Journal of British Studies 9#1 1969, pp. 122–142. online
 Podmore, Will. Britain, Italy, Germany and the Spanish Civil War (Edwin Mellen Press, 1998).
 Schwegman, Marjan. "In Love with Garibaldi: Romancing the Italian Risorgimento." European Review of History 12.2 (2005): 383–401.
 Wright, Owain. "British foreign policy and the Italian occupation of Rome, 1870." International History Review'' 34.1 (2012): 161–176.

 
United Kingdom
Italy